Gökçebey is a forested district of Zonguldak Province in the Black Sea region of Turkey. Former name of her was Tefen until 1963. She had a township in Devrek district until 1990 and has a municipality since 1972. Ankara-Zonguldak railway passes from her. The mayor is Vedat Öztürk (IYI).

References

 
Populated places in Zonguldak Province
Districts of Zonguldak Province